The Sawtooth Valley is a valley in the Western United States, in Blaine and Custer counties of central Idaho. It is surrounded by the Sawtooth Mountains to the west, White Cloud Mountains to the east, Salmon River Mountains to the north, and Boulder and Smoky Mountains to the south. The valley contains the headwaters of the Salmon River, the city of Stanley, and community of Sawtooth City.

Idaho State Highway 75, also known as the Sawtooth Scenic Byway, transverses the valley's entire length. State Highway 75 enters the valley from the south at Galena Summit and exits to the north near Stanley. Highway 75 was formerly U.S. 93, which is now routed through Arco.

Sawtooth Valley contains several large lakes in the SNRA, including Redfish, Alturas, Pettit, and Stanley lakes.

In 2017, the Sawtooth Valley was designated part of the Central Idaho Dark Sky Reserve.

References

Landforms of Blaine County, Idaho
Landforms of Custer County, Idaho
Valleys of Idaho